Julio Medina Salazar (born 16 January 1933) is a retired Colombian actor. He is notable for his debut work in Gunsmoke and for his award-winning role in Las aguas mansas. For nearly thirty years, Median worked and lived in Los Angeles until moving to Colombia since then has based his acting works there.

In his Hollywood career he has appeared in numerous television roles ranging from I Dream of Jeannie to The Partridge Family. He is considered to be the first Colombian actor to have a successful Hollywood career in the United States.

Early life
Medina was born in Chiquinquirá, Colombia in 1933. He studied at Pontifical Xavierian University and later at the Pasadena Playhouse after moving to the United States in 1954. He was enlisted in the United States Navy where he served for two years.

Career
In 1965, he moved to Peru to make small movies, but moved to the United States afterwards. 

He made his acting debut in the television series Gunsmoke (as Pedro, in S11E8 episode “The Reward”).  

In his Hollywood career he has worked alongside Michael Douglas, Hal Holbrook, David Carradine and Sally Field.

In his career in the United States, Medina also appeared in I Dream of Jeannie, The Partridge Family, Kung Fu, The Rockford Files, Wonder Woman, Dallas and in Drug Wars: The Camarena Story.

In 1984, Medina returned to Colombia where he continued to make movies and telenovelas. In Colombia, he is known for his roles in Cascabel (1985), Las Aguas Mansas (1994), La viuda de Blanco (1996) and in El pasado no perdona (2005).

He appeared in the 2016 comedy film Malcriados as Omar until retiring shortly afterwards.

Personal life
In a 2017 interview, Medina stated he lives on his own in solitude in rural Colombia and while asked about his bachelorhood and rumors about him being a homosexual, he said: "I've had friends, very beautiful friends, but marriage?!, Not even for the devil".

Partial filmography
In the United States:

1965-1972: Gunsmoke (TV Series) - Pedro / Rodríguez / Fermin
1966: I Dream of Jeannie (TV Series) - Stranger
1967-1970: The Flying Nun (TV Series) - Mayor Salvador Calderon / Farmer / Head Waiter / Juan Cortez / Pedro Caracol / Señor Trotto / Caterer
1968: El tesoro de Atahualpa
1968-1969: The Wild Wild West (TV Series) - Townsman / Don Carlos
1969: It Takes a Thief (TV Series) - Greeter / Haberdasher
1969-1970: The High Chaparral (TV Series) - First Man / Sanchez
1970: The Partridge Family (TV Series) - Chavez
1971: Bearcats! (TV Series) - Ramirez
1972: Banacek (TV Series) - Padre Borda
1973-1975: Kung Fu (TV Series) - Padre / Father Salazar
1974: The Streets of San Francisco (TV Series) - Nick Solano
1974-1976: Harry O (TV Series) - Legation Official / Jesus Quinlan / Dr. Troy
1974-1977: Chico and the Man (TV Series) - Doctor Spanola / Banker Sanchez / Mr. Delgado
1975: The Rockford Files (TV Series) - Gardener
1976-1977: Delvecchio (TV Series) - Jorge
1977: Wonder Woman (TV Series) - Captain Gaitan
1977: The Hardy Boys/Nancy Drew Mysteries (TV Series) - Clerk
1978: ABC Weekend Specials (TV Series) - Martín
1978: Police Story (TV Series) - Pedro
1979: Centennial (TV Series) - Padre Gravez
1981: Zoot Suit - Lowrider's Father
1981: The New Adventures of Zorro (TV Series) - Miguel
1982-1986: Dallas (TV Series) - Henry Figueroa
1983: The Greatest American Hero, Vanity Says The Preacher (TV Series) - Dr. Romero
1984: Scarecrow and Mrs. King (TV Series) - Caesar Varga
1984: Airwolf (TV Series) - Col. Arias
1985: Latino - Salazar
1987: Starman (TV Series) - Pepe
1988: Little Nikita - Soccer Announcer
1989: Hard Time on Planet Earth (TV Series) - Gardener
1990: Drug Wars: The Camarena Story (TV Series) - Benjamin Piza
1996: Ilona Arrives with the Rain - Wito
1998: Rizo - Ataúlfo
2002: After Party
2004: Colombianos, un acto de fe
2005: El trato
2006: Karmma, el peso de tus actos - Juan Diego Valbuena
2011: Gordo, calvo y bajito - Pedro

References

External links
 

1933 births
Living people
Colombian film actors
Colombian male television actors
People from Chiquinquirá
Pontifical Xavierian University alumni
Colombian emigrants to the United States
United States Navy sailors